Jowshaqan-e Qali Rural District is a rural district (dehestan) in Qamsar District, Kashan County, Isfahan Province, Iran. At the 2006 census, its population was 142, in 50 families.  The rural district has 3 villages.

References 

Rural Districts of Isfahan Province
Kashan County